The 2019 Engie Open Nantes Atlantique was a professional tennis tournament played on indoor hard courts. It was the sixteenth edition of the tournament which was part of the 2019 ITF Women's World Tennis Tour. It took place in Nantes, France between 28 October and 3 November 2019.

Singles main-draw entrants

Seeds

 1 Rankings are as of 21 October 2019.

Other entrants
The following players received wildcards into the singles main draw:
  Sara Cakarevic
  Irina Ramialison
  Alice Tubello

The following player received entry using a protected ranking:
  Océane Dodin

The following players received entry from the qualifying draw:
  Akgul Amanmuradova
  Mathilde Armitano
  Lucía Cortez Llorca
  Salma Djoubri
  Théo Gravouil
  Verena Meliss
  Mallaurie Noël
  Julia Terziyska

The following player received entry as a lucky loser:
  Elixane Lechemia

Champions

Singles

 Cristina Bucșa def.  Tamara Korpatsch, 6–2, 6–7(11–13), 7–6(8–6)

Doubles

 Akgul Amanmuradova /  Ekaterine Gorgodze def.  Vivian Heisen /  Yana Sizikova, 7–6(7–2), 6–3

References

External links
 2019 Engie Open Nantes Atlantique at ITFtennis.com
 Official website

2019 ITF Women's World Tennis Tour
2019 in French tennis
October 2019 sports events in France
November 2019 sports events in France
Open Nantes Atlantique